Bargerveen Nature Reserve is a nature reserve in the Dutch province of Drenthe that has been included in the Natura 2000 ecological network. Since 2006 it is part of the Internationaler Naturpark Bourtanger Moor-Bargerveen (engl. Bourtanger Moor-Bargerveen International Nature Park), a nature reserve located on both sides of the border between the Netherlands and Germany. The sparsely populated landscape consists of large peat areas, heather, and small lakes.

The Dutch part of the nature reserve was founded in 1992 as Natuurreservaat Bargerveen. It was designated as a Ramsar site (a wetland of international importance) the following year. It consists mainly of peat bog.

Bog restoration
Some of the wetland area had become degraded, and, after peat extraction was discontinued, restoration work was needed to improve water retention. The project had the objective of creating active raised bog and was coordinated by  Staatsbosbeheer, the government agency that manages the site.  The work was supported by the European Union's LIFE programme in the years 2003–2006, but it was noted that the full effects would be seen in the longer term.

Bargerveen has been twinned with two Irish Ramsar Sites, Clara Bog and Raheenmore Bog, which were identified as needing active management measures.

Flora and fauna
Bargerveen is a Special Protection Area for bird-life, and is home to large numbers of wintering bean geese. It is also an Important Bird Area: "trigger" species are the spotted crake and the red-backed shrike.

It is also a Special Area of Conservation.

References

External links

http://www.staatsbosbeheer.nl/English/Natura%202000.aspx
http://www.naturpark-moor.eu (German)
http://www.erdoel-erdgas-museum-twist.de (German)
http://www.moormuseum.de (German)
https://web.archive.org/web/20100415215906/http://www.bentheimer-landschaf.de/schutzgebiete.html (German)

Bogs of the Netherlands
Emmen, Netherlands
Geography of Drenthe
Landforms of Drenthe
Germany–Netherlands border
Important Bird Areas of the Netherlands
Nature reserves in the Netherlands
Protected areas established in 1992
Ramsar sites in the Netherlands
Special Areas of Conservation
Special Protection Areas in the Netherlands
Tourist attractions in Drenthe